Ah Saung (lit. Hostel or Amulet
) is a Burmese horror television series. It aired on Fortune TV. Ah Saung season 1 aired from June 1 to July 20, 2019, on every Saturday at 19:30 for 8 episodes and Ah Saung season 2: Dream Introduction   aired from January 11 to March 29, 2020, on every Saturday and Sunday at 19:00 for 24 episodes.

Synopsis

Season 1

A hostel restricted to "men are not allowed in". The hostel is full of interesting secrets and some parts of the hostel are not even accessible to tenants. The owner of the hostel is Mya Hnin Nu, a lonely woman with strict discipline. Seven girls came to rent the hostel. They also have secrets and past traces.

One day, the seven hostel residents unexpectedly invited a guest. What is the secret of Mya Hnin Nu, the hostel owner. What is the sad story behind the history of this building? It will capture the attention of TV viewers with horrible events, unexpected twists and turns.

Season 2

A shelter for non-relatives eight hostel residents living in the same house who met in different ways. You will feel greed, anger, love, hatred and confusion in Ah Saung 2: Dream Introduction.

Cast
Nyein Thaw as Nu Maung, Htut Khaung
Hsu Myat Noe Oo as Lin Sat
Hsu Htet Kaday as Mya Hnin Nu
Su Htat as Tharaphu, Ani
Sao Yoon Waddy Oo as Padonmar
Phyo Pa Pa Htoo as Moon Yati
Shoon Yamone as Kyi Nuu
Hsu Yee Htet as Ei Thar
Hein Zarni Khine as War So
Thel Thel Hsu Nyein as Thoon
Maysi May as Tin Ma Ma
Chit Myittar Cho as Tu Tu
Ye Aung as U Myat Kyaw
Pyay Zin as Hmue
Nyi Htut Khaung as Aldo
Russell as Khine Myae
Htoo Pyae Aung as Nathan
May Thet Kyaw as Sein
Htet Eaindra Naing as May Cho
Eaint Hmue Kay Thwe as Sandi
Young P as Key

References

Burmese television series
Fortune TV original programming